Qazim Laçi (born 19 January 1996) is an Albanian professional footballer who plays as a central midfielder for Czech First League club Sparta Prague and the Albania national team.

Club career

Early career
Laçi was born in Peshkopi, Albania, but moved to Greece when he was young and among family were placed in Galatsi where he started his youth career with the most successful club in Greek football Olympiacos

Laçi was part of the Olympiacos U-19 squad which participated in the new created championship 2013–14 UEFA Youth League, a European youth club football competition organised by UEFA, which was contested by the under-19 youth teams of the 32 clubs qualified for the group stage of the 2013–14 UEFA Champions League. He played 5 matches in this competition including two as a starter and Olympiacos U-19 were eliminated in the group stage.

In the following season 2014–15 UEFA Youth League he became a regular starter in the team where he played all matches as a starter and managed to score 4 goals. He scored in 3 consecutive group stage matches against Malmö (3–1) and two times in two matches against Juventus (1–1 & 3–0) and then another brace against Malmo in a 2–0 win. Olympiacos managed to qualify for the next round and played against Shakhtar Donetsk where they were eliminated after the Penalty shoot-out after regular time finished in a 1–1 draw, where Laçi himself scored the 4th penalty kick.

Despite he was 19-years-old according to UEFA rules, a team could take a maximum of three players born between 1 January 1996 and 31 December 1996 and Laçi managed participate with Olympiacos U-19 in another season 2015–16 UEFA Youth League. In this competition he played 5 out 6 group stage matches and all in the starting line up substituting off in just one case. Olympiacos U-19 were equally good with Arsenal and Bayern Munich collecting each 10 points but Olympiacos were ranked last of them (3rd place) due to Head-to-head rules.

Olympiacos
For the first time Laçi was included in the Olympiacos first team squad who participated in the 2014–15 Greek Cup semi-final game against Apollon Smyrni on 8 April 2015 by coach Vítor Pereira. He didn't manage to play in this match. Also after 3 weeks Laçi was included in the team for the second-leg against Apollon Smyrni but once again he didn't manage to make his debut and Olympiacos got a 1–1 draw to qualify for the Final with aggregate 4–1.

In the 2015–16 season Laçi took part with Olympiacos first team against Dinamo Zagreb on 20 October 2015, match valid for the 2015–16 UEFA Champions League group stage, where it was his first match to participate in a major competition such as the UEFA Champions League.

He made his first professional debut on 3 February 2016 under coach Marco Silva in the 2015–16 Greek Cup 1/4 finals against Asteras Tripoli coming on as a substitute in the 90th minute in place of Andreas Bouchalakis.

Loan to APOEL
On 16 June 2016, Laçi joined reigning Cypriot champions APOEL on a one-year loan deal from Olympiacos, having the chance to appear in the UEFA Champions League qualifiers with his new team. On 4 January 2017, however, after failing to appear in any official games, APOEL announced that Laçi's loan was terminated, and the player would return to Olympiacos.

Loan to Levadiakos
In January 2017 Laçi was loaned to Levadiakos He made his debut a week later on 14 January 2017 against Veria F.C. playing in the last 15 minutes.

Ajaccio
In July 2017, Laçi was loaned to Ligue 2 club Ajaccio until the end of the 2017–18 season. He scored his first goal on 18 August 2017 against Paris FC, after coming on as a substitute in the 66th minute for fellow goalscorer Johan Cavalli. Laçi managed to score after a counter-attack to secure the 2–0 victory for his side.

Sparta Prague
On 29 December 2022, Laçi signed a contract with Czech First League club Sparta Prague.

International career

Albania U17
Laçi was called up for the first time in international level at Albania national under-17 football team by coach Džemal Mustedanagić to participate in the 2013 UEFA European Under-17 Championship qualifying round in October 2012. He made his debut against Hungary U17 on 20 October 2012 coming on as a substitute in the first half in place of Berat Beqiri. For the other two group matches he was an unused substitute.

Albania U19
He advanced higherly in international level as he was called up in the Albania U19 squad by coach Foto Strakosha for the friendly match against Italy U19 on 14 May 2014.

Laçi was invited by new Albania U19s coach Altin Lala to participate in the 2015 UEFA European Under-19 Championship qualifying round for the matches against Denmark, Portugal and Wales, in the match-dates 12–17 November 2014. Under the coach Altin Lala, he played every minute in the qualifying competition but Albania U19 lost all three group matches and were ranked in the 4th last place with total of goals collected 2–7, where all two goals were scored by Esad Morina of FC Schalke 04 youth.

Albania U21
Laçi continued higherly as he was called up also in the Albania national under-21 football team by coach Skënder Gega for the start of the 2017 UEFA European Under-21 Championship qualification against Liechtenstein U21 on 28 March 2015. Anyway a few days later he declared that wasn't unable to participate in this match due to the injury. However, in September he was called up by a new appointed coach at the Albania U21, Redi Jupi, for the next 2017 UEFA European Under-21 Championship qualification matches against Israel & Portugal on 3 & 8 September 2015. In both matches he managed to play for the full 90-minutes. Albania U21 managed to take a 1–1 equaliser against Israel with a Penalty kick won by Milot Rashica and scored by Endri Çekiçi. He played another full 90-minutes match against Hungary U21 on 13 October 2015 to help his team to take a 2–2 draw. Laçi was called up for the next consecutive matches against Portugal U21 & Liechtenstein U21 on 12 & 16 November 2015. He played the full 90-minutes match against Portugal U21 where they were beaten 0–4. He scored his first goal for Albania U21 against Liechtenstein U21 on 16 November 2015 in the 83rd minute to sign the definitive result as a 2–0 victory.

Laçi was called up by coach Alban Bushi for the Friendly match against France U21 on 5 June 2017 and the 2019 UEFA European Under-21 Championship qualification opening match against Estonia U21 on 12 June 2017. During the gathering for these matches Laçi among Leonardo Maloku & Emanuele Ndoj suffered injures and missed out both matches and coach Alban Bushi called up Agim Zeka and Regi Lushkja as a replacement.

Albania
Laçi made his Albania national team debut on 7 September 2020 in a Nations League game against Lithuania. He started and played the full game as Albania lost 0–1 at home.

Career statistics

Club

International

Scores and results list Albania's goal tally first, score column indicates score after each Laçi goal.

Honours
Olympiacos
 Superleague Greece: 2015–16
 Greek Cup: 2014–15; runner-up: 2015–16

References

External links
APOEL official profile

 Qazim Laçi profile at FSHF.org

1996 births
Living people
People from Peshkopi
Albanian footballers
Albanian emigrants to Greece
Association football midfielders
Super League Greece players
Cypriot First Division players
Ligue 2 players
Olympiacos F.C. players
APOEL FC players
Levadiakos F.C. players
AC Ajaccio players
Albania youth international footballers
Albania under-21 international footballers
Albania international footballers
Albanian expatriate footballers
Albanian expatriate sportspeople in Greece
Albanian expatriate sportspeople in Cyprus
Albanian expatriate sportspeople in France
Expatriate footballers in Greece
Expatriate footballers in Cyprus
Expatriate footballers in France
AC Sparta Prague players
Expatriate footballers in the Czech Republic
Albanian expatriate sportspeople in the Czech Republic